Nawab Sayyid Muhammad Kazim Ali Khan Bahadur is an Indian politician and was a member of the 16th Legislative Assembly of Uttar Pradesh of India.  Muhammad Kazim Ali served as an MLA in the Swar Tanda Uttar Pradesh state assembly; in 2003 he was briefly the state minister for Minority Welfare and Hajj Affairs. Since 2003, he has been the Chairman of the Uttar Pradesh Tourism Development Corporation.

Khan represents the Suar constituency of Uttar Pradesh and is a member of the BSP political party. Khan has been MLA for four straight terms.

Personal life
Nawab Kazim Ali Khan was born into the royal family of Rampur in Rampur district. Khan attended the Chandigarh College of Architecture and attained Bachelor of Architecture degree. Then he moved to Columbia University and attained Master of Architecture & Design management degree. Khan has also been accorded with Order of the Griffon (Mecklenburg) honor.

On 24 December 1986 at Bangalore, Muhammad Kazim Ali Khan (then Heir Apparent, or Nawabzada), married Nawab Firda uz-Zamani Yaseen Sultan Jahan Begum Sahiba (born 26 March 1968), the younger daughter of Meherban Nawab Abdul Rashid Khan Sahib Bahadur, the Nawab of Savanur and the couple has two sons, namely;
Nawabzada Sayyid Ali Mohammad Khan Wali Ahad Bahadur (alias Kaivaan Mian), the Heir Apparent (born 16 February 1988)
Nawabzada Sayyid Haider Ali Khan Bahadur (alias Hamzah Mian) (born 18 March 1990).

Political career
Nawab Kazim Ali Khan has been a MLA for five straight terms. He represented the Suar constituency. He has twice been Minister in Samajwadi as well as Bahujan Samaj Party Government. During his first term, he represented the Bilaspur assembly constituency (now non-existent). On 14 June 2016 he has been expelled from INC  for cross voting in Rajya Sabha Elections.

Posts held

Titles
1960-1992: Nawabzada Sayyid Muhammad Kazim Ali Khan, Wali Ahad Bahadur
1992-: His Highness 'Ali Jah, Farzand-i-Dilpazir-i-Daulat-i-Inglishia, Mukhlis ud-Daula, Nasir ul-Mulk, Amir ul-Umara, Nawab Sayyid Muhammad Kazim Ali Khan Bahadur, Mustaid Jang, Nawab of Rampur

See also
Suar
Sixteenth Legislative Assembly of Uttar Pradesh
Uttar Pradesh Legislative Assembly

References 

1960 births
Indian National Congress politicians
Living people
People from Rampur district
Uttar Pradesh MLAs 1997–2002
Uttar Pradesh MLAs 2002–2007
Uttar Pradesh MLAs 2007–2012
Uttar Pradesh MLAs 2012–2017
Nawabs of Rampur
Nawabs of India
Indian Shia Muslims
Uttar Pradesh politicians
Columbia Graduate School of Architecture, Planning and Preservation alumni